The Bouvines class consisted of a pair of ironclad coastal-defense ships built for the French Navy in the 1890s,  and . Thoroughly obsolete by World War I, the ships only played a minor role during the war. They were sold for scrap in 1920.

Design and description

The Bouvines-class ships were half-sisters to the Jemmapes class laid down at the same time. They were virtually identical except that the Bouvines were given a forecastle deck to improve seaworthiness and the main armament was lightened to compensate for the additional weight, as  guns were installed rather than the 340 mm (13.4 in) guns of the Jemmapes class.

They were only slightly heavier than the Jemmapes class and displaced , only  more than the other ships. Once in service they proved to roll badly so bilge keels were later fitted. Their crew numbered 15 officers and 318 ratings; service as a flagship added 5 more officers and 33 more ratings.

The Bouvines-class ships used two inclined horizontal triple-expansion steam engines built by Menpenti of Marseilles, one engine per shaft. Bouviness engines were powered by 16  d'Allest-Lagrafel water-tube boilers and had two funnels, but Amiral Tréhouart used the same number of Belleville boilers instead and had only one funnel.

Armament and armor

Like the Jemmapes class, the Bouvines-class ships carried their main armament of two 45-caliber Canon de 305 mm Modèle 1887 guns in two single-gun turrets, one each fore and aft of the superstructure. The guns could be depressed to −4° and elevation to +10°.

The ships' secondary armament consisted of eight 53-caliber Canon de  Modèle 1892 guns, four of which were mounted in individual casemates. The other four were carried on pivot mounts with gun shields on the shelter deck directly above the four casemated guns on the corners of the superstructure.

Initially four 40-caliber  Canon de 47 mm Modèle 1885 Hotchkiss guns were carried for defence from torpedo boats in the fighting top in the military mast, but this was later increased to eight, with the new guns on the superstructure. Initially ten  Hotchkiss revolving cannon were positioned on the superstructure, but this was reduced to three when the additional 47 mm guns were added. Two  torpedo tubes were mounted above the waterline, but they were removed in 1906.

The armor of the Bouvines-class ships weighted . The ships were intended to have  of the belt showing above the waterline, but they were overweight as completed and only  of the belt was above the waterline. The hull above the belt was completely unarmored. The plates protecting the conning tower measured  in thickness.

Ships
Bouvines was authorized in the Supplementary Estimates of 1889 although Amiral Tréhouart had been authorized in the 1889 Ordinary Naval Estimates with the name of Tréhouart, although she was renamed on 25 March 1895. Bouvines was ordered on 18 December 1889.

History

Bouvines served as a flagship for the entirety of her active service where she served both in the Northern Squadron and Channel Flotilla in the Bay of Biscay and the English Channel as well as in the Mediterranean Squadron. She was stricken on 1 July 1913 and was used by the Inspection Service at Cherbourg between 1914 and 1917. She was condemned in 1918 and sold for scrapping in 1920.

Little is known of Amiral Tréhouarts career other than she served as a submarine tender during World War I.

Notes

Citations

References

External links

 nice picture gallery of the ships once you scroll about 2/3 down

Ships built in France
Coastal defense ships of the French Navy